William Hull Wickham (July 30, 1832 – January 13, 1893) was the 81st Mayor of New York City and anti-Ring Democrat who helped to topple corrupt politician Boss Tweed.

Early life
Wickham was born in Smithtown on Long Island, but was raised in New York.  He was the son of Daniel H. and Ruth Wickham, who lived at 71 West 11th Street in New York.

He was a distant cousin of John Wickham, the attorney for Aaron Burr during his trial for treason. It was Burr who transformed Tammany into a political machine for the election of 1800.

Career
Early in his career, he worked for the Pacific Mail Steamship Company and was a volunteer fireman.  Wickham joined Mutual Hook and Ladder Company No. 1 in 1850 and served as foreman.  In 1854, he organized the Baxter Hook and Ladder Company No. 15.  He was elected Secretary of the New York Fire Department in 1858, Vice President in 1859, and President from 1860 until 1861.

Political career
In the early 1870s, Wickham became an anti-Ring Democrat opposed to Boss Tweed of Tammany Hall.  Wickham served as Chairman of the Apollo Hall Democracy, a political group that worked to bring Boss Tweed to justice.  He also served on the Executive Committee of Seventy, a group formed by the public to reestablish honest government.

In 1874, Wickham was nominated by the Democrats to be Mayor of New York, with the support of a temporarily reformed Tammany Hall.  He easily defeated Oswald Ottendorfer, the Independent Democratic candidate, and Salem Howe Wales, the Republican.  During his two-year tenure starting in 1875, Wickham appointed William C. Whitney to be the City of New York's legal counsel to combat political fraud.  Wickham also conducted fundraising for the pedestal of the Statue of Liberty.

Wickham declined to be re-nominated in 1876.  He served on the Board of Education for several years and was a member of the Committee of One Hundred for New York's Columbian celebration.

Personal life
He was married to Louise Shepard Floyd (1836–1899), the daughter of Jesse Woodhull Floyd (1787–1849) and Miami (née Shepard) Floyd (1795–1880). Together, they were the parents of a daughter:

 Louise Floyd Wickham (1858–1933), who did not marry and who attended Miss Porter's School in Farmington, Connecticut.

After the death of his sister, he adopted her three grown children, one son and two daughters, as his own, and they all lived together at his home.

He died at his home, 338 Lexington Avenue, in New York City on January 13, 1893, from heart disease along with his ailment of Bright's Disease.

Legacy
A street in the North Bronx is named after Wickham.

References

1832 births
1893 deaths
Mayors of New York City
New York (state) Democrats
19th-century American politicians